The following is a list of Pittsburgh Penguins broadcasters for the Pittsburgh Penguins of the National Hockey League.

Television

2010s

2000s

1990s

Jake Ploeger and Jeanne Blackburn also hosted Pittsburgh Penguins Confidential, a syndicated weekly half-hour series devoted to the team that was broadcast only on stations in Western Pennsylvania, Eastern Ohio and Northern West Virginia from 1996 to 1999.

1980s

1970s

1960s

Radio

2010s

2000s

1990s

1980s

1970s

1960s

See also
Pittsburgh_Penguins#Broadcasters
Pittsburgh Penguins Radio Network
Historical NHL over-the-air television broadcasters

External links
 The official website of the Pittsburgh Penguins

References

 
broadcasters
Lists of National Hockey League broadcasters
Prime Sports
Fox Sports Networks
AT&T SportsNet